Münster-Sprakel is a railway station located in Sprakel close to Münster, Germany.

History

The station is located on the Münster–Rheine line. The train services are operated by Deutsche Bahn and the WestfalenBahn.

Train services
The following services currently call at Münster-Sprakel:

Railway stations in North Rhine-Westphalia